"Am I Blue" is a song written by David Chamberlain, and recorded by American country music artist George Strait.  It was released in August 1987 as the third and final single from his album Ocean Front Property.  It became his 12th number 1 single in the U.S.

Critical reception
Kevin John Coyne of Country Universe gave the song a B+ grade, saying that it "revels in his Western swing roots." He goes on to say that "the contemporary production makes it timely, but the arrangements and vocal performance make it timeless."

Charts

References

1987 singles
1986 songs
George Strait songs
Song recordings produced by Jimmy Bowen
MCA Records singles
Songs written by David Chamberlain (songwriter)